Kinnoull Football Club are a Scottish football club based in the Tulloch area of Perth. Formed in 1943, they play their home games at Tulloch Park and their team colours are red with a white trim.

The club won the Tayside Premier Division in season 2005–06 and gained promotion to the East Super League for the 2006–07 season. However they only spent one season in the top tier before being relegated.

Kinnoull are one of four senior football clubs based in Perth, the others being professional side St Johnstone, East of Scotland Football League club Jeanfield Swifts and Letham of the Midlands League.

The team have been managed since May 2014 by Alan Cameron.

Notable former players
Paul Deas
Jim Weir

Honours
East Region Tayside Premier winners: 2005–06
 East Region Central Division winners: 2012–13
 Tayside Premier Division winners: 1982–83, 1983–84
 Tayside Division One winners: 1980–81, 1988–89
 Currie (Findlay & Co) Cup: 1928–29, 1969–70, 1984–85
 Division One Rosebank Car Centre Cup: 2001–02
 Division One (Downfield SC Cup) winners: 1988–89
 Tayside Drybrough Cup: 1984–85
 Tayside Regional Cup: 1984–85
 Perthshire Junior Consolation Cup: 1965–66
 Craig Stephen Cup: 1983–84

References

External links
 Official website

Football clubs in Scotland
East of Scotland Football League teams
Scottish Junior Football Association clubs
Sport in Perth, Scotland
Football clubs in Perth and Kinross
Association football clubs established in 1943
1943 establishments in Scotland